Piruz (also Romanized as Pīrūz; also known as Fārī and Parī) is a village in Kamazan-e Vosta Rural District, Zand District, Malayer County, Hamadan Province, Iran. At the 2006 census, its population was 1,157, in 310 families.

During the Iranian Revolution, on 13 May 1978, the Piruz incident took place near Piruz, when several students travelling by bus from Malayer were stopped at an army check point and shot. On several demonstrations in Hamadan Province the punishment of the soldiers was demanded, but only one of the soldiers was sentenced.

References 

Populated places in Malayer County